Tracy Jaeckel (February 5, 1905 – August 6, 1969) was an American fencer. He won a bronze medal in the team épée event at the 1932 Summer Olympics.

See also
List of Princeton University Olympians

References

External links
 

1905 births
1969 deaths
American male épée fencers
Fencers at the 1932 Summer Olympics
Fencers at the 1936 Summer Olympics
Olympic bronze medalists for the United States in fencing
Sportspeople from New York City
Medalists at the 1932 Summer Olympics
20th-century American people